Platyptilia microbscura is a moth of the family Pterophoridae. It is known from Misool Island in Indonesia.

References

microbscura
Endemic fauna of Indonesia
Moths described in 2007